The Adventures of Smilin' Jack (1943) is a Universal movie serial based on the popular comic strip The Adventures of Smilin' Jack by Zack Mosley. It was directed by Lewis D. Collins and Ray Taylor.

Plot
In 1941, an American aviator, 'Smilin' Jack' Martin wishes to resign as an advisor to the Nationalist Chinese Army in order to return to the United States to enlist as an aviator in America's military buildup prior to the attack on Pearl Harbor.  He is delayed when the Chinese discover that the neutral Tibetan like Mandon "Province" contains a secret road from India to China crucial for the Allied war effort.  Determined to obtain the secret for themselves, or equally determined to have the secret destroyed is the Japanese espionage organisation "The Black Samurai" and the German intelligence agent Fräulein von Teufel who masquerades as an American newspaper reporter.

Cast

Production
The serial was based on the comic strip by Zack Moseley but it was not in the spirit of the strip as would normally be expected from a Universal production. Very little of the original comic strip was used and a new character, Tommy Thompson, was created by Universal. The similarity to Tommy Tomkins, of the Tailspin Tommy stories, may imply a crossover of sorts. Cline suggests that it was "a quick attempt to get a story on screen about a topical subject, and could have had almost any flyer with any name as a hero.”

Chapter titles
 The High Road to Doom
 The Rising Sun Strikes
 Attacked by Bombers
 Knives of Vengeance
 A Watery Grave
 Escape by Clipper
 Fifteen Fathoms Below
 Treachery at Sea
 The Bridge of Peril
 Blackout in the Islands
 Held for Treason
 The Torture Fire Test
 Sinking the Rising Sun
Source:

Quotes
United Nations means united friends-Capt. Wing

References

External links

Download or view online
 Complete serial at The Internet Archive

 
 
 
 
 
 

 
 
 
 
 
 

1943 films
1943 adventure films
American aviation films
World War II films made in wartime
Films set in Asia
American black-and-white films
War adventure films
1940s English-language films
Universal Pictures film serials
Films based on American comics
Films directed by Ray Taylor
Films directed by Lewis D. Collins
American adventure films